Gene Autry and the Mounties is a 1951 American Western film directed by John English and written by Norman S. Hall. The film stars Gene Autry, Elena Verdugo, Carleton Young, Richard Emory, Herbert Rawlinson and Trevor Bardette. The film was released on January 30, 1951, by Columbia Pictures.

Plot

Cast
Gene Autry as Gene Autry
Elena Verdugo as Marie Duval
Carleton Young as Pierre LaBlond
Richard Emory as Terry Dillon
Herbert Rawlinson as Inspector Wingate
Trevor Bardette as Raoul Duval
Francis McDonald as Batiste
Jim Frasher as Jack Duval
Pat Buttram as Scat Russell
Champion as Champ

References

External links
 

1951 films
American Western (genre) films
1951 Western (genre) films
Columbia Pictures films
Films directed by John English
American black-and-white films
1950s English-language films
1950s American films